Bathyergoides is an extinct genus of rodent from Africa thought to be related to the modern blesmols. It is the only member of the family Bathyergoididae. Fossils of Bathyergoides neotertiarius were recovered from the Early Miocene Elisabeth Bay Formation of Namibia.

References

Bibliography 
 

Hystricognath rodents
Prehistoric rodent genera
Miocene rodents
Miocene mammals of Africa
Fossils of Namibia
Fossil taxa described in 1923
Taxa named by Ernst Stromer